Brothers John E. Biddle (January 8, 1872  February 1, 1902) and Edward C. Biddle (December 27, 1876  February 1, 1902) were condemned prisoners who escaped from the Allegheny County Jail in Pittsburgh, Pennsylvania using tools and weapons supplied to them by the warden's wife, Kate Soffel (June27, 1867August30, 1909) who fled with them.
During the subsequent pursuit and capture all three were wounded, the brothers mortally.

The incident is the basis of the 1984 film Mrs. Soffel.



Background 
Jack and Ed Biddle were born (January8, 1872 and December27, 1876, respectively) in Anderdon Township, Essex County, Ontario (now part of Amherstburg, Ontario) to George and Mary Ann ( McQuaide) Biddle.
Soffel was born Anna Katharina Dietrich in Pittsburgh, Pennsylvania.

The Biddles were arrested on April 12, 1901 at a house in Allegheny County, Pennsylvania as leaders of the "Chloroform Gang", which for more than a year had been overpowering victims with chloroform or ether before robbing them.
Tried and convicted on December 12, 1901 of the murder of a Mt. Washington shopkeeper, they were imprisoned in Allegheny County Jail to await hanging.

Escape 
Kate Soffel, wife of warden Peter Soffel,
frequently came into contact with prisoners in her efforts to rehabilitate them.
She developed an infatuation with Ed Biddle, and eventually agreed to help the brothers escape by smuggling saws and guns to them.

The brothers sawed openings in the bars of their cells,
and at 4am on January29, 1902 one of them called out that his brother was ill.
As a guard approached, Jack Biddle lunged through the opening between the bars and, seizing the guard by the waist, threw him over a railing to the stone floor sixteen feet below.
Ed Biddle shot and wounded a second guard.

The Biddles locked the wounded guards, and the third guard on duty, in the prison "dungeon".
After changing from their prison jumpsuits into the guards' street clothes,
they left the prison to rendezvous with Soffel.
Only at the guards' 6am shift change was the escape discovered.

Pursuit and recapture 

The three took a trolley to West View, Pennsylvania, then walked a mile to a farm on Route 19, where they stole a sleigh and a shotgun and started for Butler County.

Meanwhile, Charles "Buck" McGovern (one of the detectives who had originally arrested the Biddles) gathered a posse,
assuming the fugitives were headed for Canada
and would follow back roads.

McGovern stationed his men at the Graham Farm in Butler County and waited.
After some time the brothers approached, bringing the sleigh to a halt as they realized they were surrounded.
One of the detectives recounted the story:

However, this account conflicts with that of Jack Biddle:

What precisely happened during the showdown is uncertain, but the police may have opened fire on Soffel and the Biddles when they made their attempt at suicide.
Reporters later described Jack Biddle as "riddled with buckshot",
mentioning that the Biddles were armed with a shotgun, but stated that the police only carried revolvers and rifles.

As detectives approached the wounded brothers, Kate Soffel lay near them; she had shot herself.
The detectives believed Ed Biddle to be reaching for a pistol, and so they shot him again, with McGovern firing at the brothers until his rifle's magazine became empty.

All three were taken to the jail at Butler,
where the brothers were placed in adjoining cells.
There Jack denied killing the Mt. Washington shopkeeper and a detective who had been shot dead during the Biddles' arrest.

Death and burial of Biddle brothers
Ed had sustained three gunshot wounds, and Jack was described as "riddled with bullets."
Jack died at 7:35pm on February1the third day after the shootingand Ed, who had been largely unconscious most of the time, died at 11pm.

The brothers' bodies were returned to Pittsburgh where they were met by a large crowd: they had become local celebrities. Thousands showed up to their viewing, some believing they were innocent.
They were buried in the Calvary Cemetery on 5 Feb, 1902. Originally the grave was unmarked due to the fact that though they received the last rites performed by Catholic priests, but Ed Biddle committed suicide and suicide was prohibited by Catholic Church, therefore the Biddle brothers can only be buried in the westernmost slope section, Section 1 within Calvary Cemetery. 

In 1983, during the filming of Mrs. Soffel, Ron Nyswaner, a Greene County, Pennsylvania resident and a screenwriter, arranged for MGM to erect a headstone. The headstone is inscribed with not only the names and dates of death, but also the last verse of the poem penned by Ed Biddle----it's noteworthy here that this poem was written to Julia Foster, daughter of Biddle's one-time spiritual adviser Rev. F.N.Foster, not as what the movie "Mrs Soffel" implied that Ed Biddle wrote to Mrs. Soffel.

Soffel's later life 
After recovering from her bullet wound and possible pneumonia
Soffel was returned to Pittsburgh, where she confessed to aiding the Biddles' escape and received a two-year sentence on 10 May, 1902, at the Western Penitentiary, but her sentence was reduced for 5 months due to her good behavior, and she was released in Dec 1903. 

Removed from his job as warden, Soffel's husband divorced his wife in 1903, and remarried in Feb 1907, and moved with the couple's children to Canton, Ohio until his death on 11 September, 1936.

Kate Soffel briefly attempted to star in a drama, A Desperate Chance, after she was released in Dec 1903, but the production was, according to the New York Times, "enjoined by the Fayette County Court". Soffel later returned to Pittsburgh and resided in the North Side(then called City of Allegheny) and took up dressmaking, and sometimes used 
her maiden name of Dietrich, or called herself Katherine Miller (Miller being the name of a brother-in-law).
She died of typhoid fever on 30 Aug, 1909  and was buried in her mother's unmarked grave 2 days later in Smithfield East End Cemetery.

Legacy 
The Biddle Boys and Mrs Soffel case was sometimes regarded as the first "Crime of the Century" before Thaw-White murder case in 1906, and it caused a huge sensation that a wife of the warden would escape with two notorious criminals back then, and inspired a number of works and plays about them, and one of the most famous books was "THE BIDDLE BOYS AND MRS. SOFFEL: THE GREAT PITTSBURG TRAGEDY AND ROMANCE", by Arthur Forrest, just a few years removed from the case in 1902. 

In 1984, the movie Mrs Soffel was released by MGM and starred Diane Keaton as Kate Soffel, Mel Gibson as Ed Biddle, and Matthew Modine as Jack Biddle, and the production took place in the old Allegheny County Jail for 3 days, and then elsewhere in Wisconsin and Toronto. The movie was one of the movies that really shows then-interior scenes of the old Allegheny County Jail before it was closed in 1995, and prisoners there were used as extras in the movie. 

In 2001, a lyric opera titled "The Biddle Boys and Mrs Soffel" was performed in Pittsburgh, and the lyric opera was composed by Jeremy Beck, and excerpts of the play can be accessed at both Beckmusic.org website and Youtube.

In 2002, University of Pittsburgh emeritus professor William E. Coles Jr. published a book, Compass in the Blood, fictionalizing his own experience in doing research on Biddle-Soffel case and searching for Mrs Soffel final resting place, but he never finished the would-be sequel before his death in Mar 2005. 

And recalling, recounting, and retelling and even tales of the Biddle Boys and Mrs Soffel is a perennial topic not only in Pittsburgh, but also in nearby Ross Township and Perrysville, two locations along the escape route chosen by the Biddle brothers and Kate Soffel.

References

External links
 

People from Essex County, Ontario
Prisoners and detainees of Pennsylvania
Sibling duos
People shot dead by law enforcement officers in the United States
20th-century criminals
Burials at Calvary Catholic Cemetery (Pittsburgh)
American escapees